Kiritiri is a Town found in Mbeere South. is a settlement in the Eastern Province of Kenya.

References 

Populated places in Eastern Province (Kenya)